The  Vickers 10 inch naval gun was used on battleships and armoured cruisers built during the first decade of the 20th century. They were used as the Type 41 10-inch /45-caliber aboard the British-built semi-dreadnought  and s of the Imperial Japanese Navy.

History

Japanese service
The Type 41  naval gun was designed by Vickers specifically for the Imperial Japanese Navy, and was of a very similar design to the Vickers-built Mark VII guns produced initially for the Chilean Navy and later used in Royal Navy service.

The  used these weapons as secondary armament. The Satsuma class was originally intended to be built with all  guns, which would have made this class the first true all big gun dreadnought class in the world; however, budgetary constraints forced the Japanese navy to use a mixture of 12 and 10-inch guns, as per the previous Kashima class.

The gun was officially designated as "Type 41" from the 41st year of the reign of Emperor Meiji on 25 December 1908. It was further re-designated in centimeters on 5 October 1917 as part of the standardization process for the Imperial Japanese Navy to the metric system.

After the scrapping of both the Katori class and the Satsuma class under the terms of the Washington Naval Treaty in 1923, the guns were salvaged and used in coastal artillery batteries. The guns formerly on the Aki were re-used in fortifications around Tokyo Bay.

The Type 41 10-inch gun fired a  shell with either an armor-piercing, high-explosive or general-purpose warhead.

United Kingdom service
Vickers supplied 5 of their 10-inch 45-calibre guns for use on the battleship Libertad that they were building for Chile. These guns fired a  projectile using  of cordite MD propellant.

Italian service
Each of the  armoured cruisers was fitted with four of these guns.

See also

Weapons of comparable role, performance and era
 EOC 10-inch /45 naval gun : EOC equivalent

Notes

References

External links

 Tony DiGiulian, British 10"/45 (25.4 cm) Marks VI and VII 

 

Naval guns of the United Kingdom
254 mm artillery
Vickers